The Byrd Park Court Historic District encompasses a small, well-preserved residential subdivision in western Richmond, Virginia.  Located just east of William Byrd Park, nearly opposite the Swan Lake Drive entrance, stands Byrd Park Court, a loop road on which are set six duplexes and six single-family houses.  A stone gate flanks the entrance, and the center of the loop has a grassy area with a water fountain.  The houses were built in the 1920s, in a variety of period revival styles with Craftsman touches.

The district was added to the National Register of Historic Places in 2016.

See also
National Register of Historic Places listings in Richmond, Virginia

References

Historic districts on the National Register of Historic Places in Virginia
Mission Revival architecture in Virginia
Buildings and structures in Richmond, Virginia
National Register of Historic Places in Richmond, Virginia